William Bowen (1862 – 26 September 1925) was a Welsh international rugby union player who played club rugby for Swansea and was capped 13 times for Wales. Bowen captained Wales on one occasion.

Rugby career
Bowen was first selected to play for Wales against England at the Rectory Field, Blackheath in 1886 under the captaincy of Charlie Newman. Although Wales lost the game, the press were generally positive of the Welsh play and pointed out the forwards for their strong play. Bowen was re-selected for the next game of the 1886 Home Nations Championship this time against Scotland at the Cardiff Arms Park.

In 1887 Bowen played in all three games of the 1887 Championship, including the draw with England at Llanelli's cricket ground and the win against Ireland at Birkenhead Park. The Scottish game was not a memorable match for Wales, with the Scottish players running in twelve tries without reply, including five for George Lindsay. Although Bowen missed the 1888 tournament he did play against the touring New Zealand Maoris.

After playing all five games of the 1889 and 1990 Championships, Bowen was given the captaincy against England on 3 January 1891. Wales lost the game, and the captaincy was passed to Llanelli's William H. Thomas, though at the time the captaincy was normally chosen by the players before the match rather than by the selectors. Bowen's last game for Wales was against Scotland at Raeburn Place in another one sided win for the Scottish team.

International matches played
Wales
  1886, 1887, 1890, 1891
  1887, 1889, 1890
  1888
  1886, 1887, 1889, 1890, 1891

Bibliography

References

1862 births
1925 deaths
Rugby union locks
Rugby union players from Pembroke
Swansea RFC players
Wales international rugby union players
Wales rugby union captains
Welsh rugby union players